ArenaBowl XXV was the 25th edition of the championship in the Arena Football League. The National Conference champion, Arizona Rattlers, defeated the American Conference champion, Philadelphia Soul, 72–54.
The game was played on August 10, 2012. It was the first ArenaBowl at a neutral site since ArenaBowl XXII in 2008, also played in New Orleans. ArenaBowl XXV was played at the New Orleans Arena in New Orleans, Louisiana, home of the New Orleans VooDoo.

Venue
ArenaBowl XXV was played at the New Orleans Arena in New Orleans, Louisiana. It was the first ArenaBowl at a neutral site since 2008. From 2005-2008, the ArenaBowl were hosted at neutral sites (Las Vegas and New Orleans). In 2010 and 2011, the games went to the highest seed in the game, which were Spokane, Washington and Phoenix, Arizona. The last two ArenaBowls at a neutral site (ArenaBowl XXI and ArenaBowl XXII) were also played in New Orleans in 2007 and 2008.

Television
ArenaBowl XXV was televised on NFL Network after the AFL and NFL Network agreed on a third straight contract to carry games. The game was pushed back to a kickoff at 10:30 pm ET. NFL Network bumped the ArenaBowl back and instead broadcast Tim Tebow's preseason debut with the New York Jets, who faced the Cincinnati Bengals in the preseason.

Background

Arizona Rattlers

In the previous season, the Rattlers lost ArenaBowl XXIV to the Jacksonville Sharks on the final play of the game. In 2012, they won a tightly contested West division with a 13–5 record for their third consecutive division title. They defeated division rivals San Jose and Utah, respectively, to win the National Conference championship.

Philadelphia Soul

After missing the playoffs in the prior season, the Soul compiled a league-best 15–3 record. They averaged 68.2 points per game, the most by one team in a single season. They beat the New Orleans VooDoo in the conference semifinals, then blew out the defending champion Jacksonville Sharks in the American Conference championship 89–34, the most one-sided victory in AFL postseason history. For Philadelphia, it was their second ArenaBowl appearance in franchise history, and their second in three seasons of play. Their prior ArenaBowl appearance occurred in  when they won ArenaBowl XXII against the San Jose SaberCats 59–56. Following that season, the league suspended operations, and the Soul would not field a team again until .

Box score

References

025
2012 Arena Football League season
Arena Football League in New Orleans
2012 in sports in Louisiana
Arizona Rattlers
Philadelphia Soul
Football, American
2012 in American television
August 2012 sports events in the United States
2010s in New Orleans